The Strachey baronetcy, of Sutton Court in the County of Somerset, England, is a title in the Baronetage of the United Kingdom. This family was originally seated at Walden, Essex, where William Strachey was living under the rule of Edward VI. Later they moved to Surrey and at last settled at Sutton Court, Somerset. The title was created on 15 June 1801 for the politician and civil servant Henry Strachey. Sir Henry was private secretary to Lord Clive during his last expedition to India in 1764. He also took part in negotiations for peace with North America where he assisted the kings commissioners at Paris. He died in 1809 and was succeeded by his eldest son Henry, the second Baronet Strachey. His great-grandson, the fourth Baronet, was a Liberal politician. On 3 November 1911, he was created Baron Strachie, of Sutton Court in the County of Somerset, in the Peerage of the United Kingdom. He later served as Paymaster-General. The peerage became extinct on the death of his son, the second Baron, in 1973. The late Baron was succeeded in the baronetcy by his first cousin once removed, the sixth Baronet. He was the son of John Strachey, son and namesake of John Strachey, second son of the third Baronet. Strachey died January 2014 and did not use his title. Also, he had not successfully proven his succession and was therefore not on the Official Roll of the Baronetage, with the baronetcy considered dormant.

Several other members of the Strachey family have also gained distinction. John Strachey, grandfather of the first Baronet, was a noted geologist, while his father, John Strachey (died 1674), was a friend of John Locke. Edward Strachey, second son of the first Baronet, was the father of 1) the civil servant John Strachey, and 2) Lieutenant-General Sir Richard Strachey, who was the father of Lytton Strachey, James Strachey, Oliver Strachey and Dorothy Bussy. The aforementioned John Strachey, second son of the third Baronet, was a noted journalist, while his son John Strachey was a Labour politician. Another son of the third Baronet, Henry Strachey, was a painter and art critic. Sir Edward Strachey, third Baronet (1812–1901) was a religious and philosophical writer, the son of Edward Strachey, the second son of 1st Baronet Harry Strachey.

The family surname is pronounced "Stray-chee".

Strachey baronets, of Sutton Court (1801)
Sir Henry Strachey, 1st Baronet (1737–1810)
Sir Henry Strachey, 2nd Baronet (1772–1858)
Sir Edward Strachey, 3rd Baronet (1812–1901)
Sir Edward Strachey, 4th Baronet (1858–1936) (created Baron Strachie in 1911)

Barons Strachie (1911)
Edward Strachey, 1st Baron Strachie (1858–1936)
Edward Strachey, 2nd Baron Strachie (1882–1973)

Strachey baronets, of Sutton Court (1801; reverted)
Charles Strachey, presumed 6th Baronet (1934–2014)
Henry Leoffric Benvenuto Strachey, presumed 7th Baronet (born 1947)

Notes

References
Kidd, Charles, Williamson, David (editors). Debrett's Peerage and Baronetage (1990 edition). New York: St Martin's Press, 1990.,

External links

Strachey
Baronets